"Who Comes to Boogie" is a single by the Washington, D.C. Go-go group Little Benny & the Masters that was released in 1984. The single reached #33 in the UK Singles Chart in February 1985.

Track listing
 7" Single
 "Who Comes to Boogie (Radio Edit)" (Robert Freeman) – 3:50
 "Who Comes to Boogie" – 3:52

 12" Single
 "Who Comes to Boogie (Club Mix)" – 7:16
 "Who Comes to Boogie" – 7:37
 "Who Comes to Boogie" (Radio) – 3:50

Charts

Personnel
Benny Anthony Harley – lead vocals and trumpet
Mark Lawston - keyboards 
Lowell Tucker - keyboards 
Tommy Crosby – guitars
Rick Holmes - bass
Rick Wellman - drums
Tyron Williams - percussion
Steve Colman, Vernon McDonald, Reggie Thomas – brass instruments
Diane Borg, Kim Anderson – backing vocals
Dana Mozie,  – dj cutting and scratching

References

1984 debut singles
Go-go songs
1984 songs